This is a list of rail trails around the world longer than 0.1 miles (160 metres). Rail trails are former railway lines that have been converted to paths designed for pedestrian, bicycle, skating, equestrian, and/or light motorized traffic. Most are multiuse trails offering at least pedestrians and cyclists recreational access and right-of-way to the routes.

Asia 

Israel 
 The Jerusalem Railway Park

South Korea 

 Parts of Old Jungang line (Paldang-Yangpyeong)

Taiwan 

 Dongfeng Bicycle Green Way
 Hou-Fong bike path
 Tanya Shen Green Bikeway
 Taolin Bikeway

Europe

Austria 
A more complete reference can be found at www.bahntrassenradeln.de.

Lower Austria 
 Dampfross und Drahtesel on the former :de:Stammersdorfer Lokalbahn
 :de:Traisentalradweg on the former :de:Leobersdorfer Bahn

Upper Austria 
 Reichraminger Hintergebirgs on former :de:Waldbahn Reichraming
 Part of :de:Steyrtalradweg follows the former :de:Steyrtalbahn

Salzburg 
 Salzkammergut-Lokalbahn-Radweg on the former :de:Salzkammergut-Lokalbahn between Strobl and St. Gilgen
 :de:Salzkammergut-Radweg on the former :de:Ischlerbahn and :de:Salzkammergut-Lokalbahn from Salzburg to Bad Ischl

Styria 
 The first 18 kilometers of the :de:Feistritztal-Radweg between Ratten and :de:Birkfeld on a dismantled part of the :de:Feistritztalbahn

Belgium 
 Line 29 from Aarschot to Herentals
 Line 29 north of Turnhout towards the Dutch border
 Line 38 from Liège to Hombourg (Ravel 5)
 Line 62 from Ostend to Torhout
 Part of line 109 from Chimay to Froidchapelle
 Line 142 from Namur to Hoegaarden (Ravel 2)
 Most of Line 160 from Brussels to Tervuren
 Part of line 163A from Sainte-Cécile to Muno

Czech Republic 
 Line 257 from Kyjov to Mutěnice
 Line 302 from Nezamyslice to Morkovice-Slížany
 Line 326 from Hostašovice to Nový Jičín

Denmark 
 Fodsporet, 40 km between Slagelse and Næstved via Dalmose plus 12 km between Dalmose and Skælskør in the southeastern part of Sjælland opened 2011
 Himmerlandsstien, 70 km between Viborg and Løgstør in the northern part of Jutland opened 2007 (Danish: :da:Himmerlandsstien)
 Naturstien Horsens-Silkeborg Naturetrail, 60 km between Horsens-Silkeborg in the middle of Jutland

Finland 
 Baana, a 1.5-km (0.93 miles) section of the old Helsinki harbour rail line.

France 
 Avenue Verte between St-Aubin-le-Cauf (near Dieppe) and Forges-les-Eaux
 The promenade plantée ("walk with trees") (4.5 km) in the 12th arrondissement of Paris, France; built on the former railway line between Bastille area and the eastern suburbs of Paris (1859 - 1969)
 Coulée verte ("green belt") (29 km), on the former railway lines from Amiens and Beauvais (43 km), opened for the traffic between 1874 and 1972 or 1990
 Coulée verte ("green belt") (1 km), on the former transversal railway line (closed in 1979) between the station of Colombes and the station of "Les Vallées" la Garenne-Colombes
 The voie verte ("green way") is a former railway line transformed in bicycle trail in the Vosges; it links Remiremont to Bussang and Remiremont to Cornimont
 Voie verte from Givry to Mâcon
 Voie verte from Mios to Bazas, a former railway line transformed into a bicycle trail (76 km) in the Aquitaine
 The Roger Lapébie bike path runs for 57 km from Bordeaux, through Créon and onto Sauveterre-de-Guyenne.

Germany 
These are some of the longest rail trails in Germany:
 The Bahnradweg Hessen with a total length of  following old tracks of the Vogelsbergbahn, Vogelsberger Südbahn, Biebertalbahn and Ulstertalbahn.
 The Bockl-Radweg in Bavaria with a total length of 45 km on the old track, from Neustadt a.d. Waldnaab to Eslarn
 The Nordbahntrasse trail crosses for 23 km the city of Wuppertal, and has so far one of the highest standards of rail trails in Germany.

Hungary 
 Part of line 11 from Szentkirályszabadja to Balatonalmádi
 Old track of line 25 from Bagod to Zalalövő
 Part of line 49 from Tamási to Pári
 Part of line 63 from Pécs to Pellérd
 Part of line 65 from Harkány to Drávaszabolcs
 Part of the disused narrow gauge line from Sátoraljaújhely to Pálháza
 Part of the disused line from Bárdudvarnok to Lipótfa

Ireland 
 Athlone to Mullingar Cycleway
 Great Southern Trail 
 Great Western Greenway

In planning/under construction 
 Connemara Greenway (under development)
 Deise Greenway (under development), when completed, this rail trail is planned to follow the route of the former Dungarvan to Waterford railway, passing through Stradbally and Kilmacthomas; initial stage at the Dungarvan end has been completed
 Tralee-Fenit Greenway (under development)

Isle of Man 
 Isle of Man Steam Heritage Trail: Douglas to Peel (10 miles)

Luxembourg 
 Prince Henri railway in Clemency, converted into a cycle track

Norway 
 Skreia Line

Portugal 
 Ecopista do Rio Minho
 Ecovia do Rio Lima
 Ecopista do Tâmega
 Ecopista do Dão

Slovenia 
 Jesenice to Tarvisio (Italy): (35 km approx.)

Spain 
 Senda del oso, Asturias
 Vía Verde de la Sierra (mountain's rail track), Cádiz and Seville
 Vía Verde de la Sierra de la Demanda, Burgos
 Vía Verde de Ojos Negros, Valencia and Teruel
 GIRONA - NARROW-GAUGE RAILWAY ROUTE I - This 57-km route crosses three regions and twelve towns, following the valleys of the Fluvià, Brugent and Ter rivers. The Narrow-Gauge Railway Route descends smoothly from Olot (440 m) to Girona (70 m).
 GIRONA - NARROW-GAUGE RAILWAY ROUTE II - The Narrow-Gauge Railway Route stretches out 39.7 km. With a smooth incline from Girona to Sant Feliu de Guíxols (15 m), its highest point is at Cassà de la Selva (136 m). Following the old narrow-gauge railway line from Girona to Sant Feliu, you can get to know two of Girona's regions - the Gironès and the Baix Empordà - from the Ter River basin, crossing the Selva depression and ending in the Ridaura valley.

Sweden 
 Banvallsleden (~ 150 km/93 miles)
 Sjuhäradsrundan Borås to Ulricehamn(45 km/27 miles)
 Ätradalsleden Falköping to Ambjörnarp (93 km/ 55 miles)

United Kingdom

England
 Addiscombe Railway Park: Addiscombe to Woodside, South London (0.6 miles)
 Alban Way: St Albans to Hatfield, Hertfordshire (7.5 miles)
 Angel Walk: Edmonton, North London (0.2 miles)
 Auckland Way: Spennymoor to Bishop Auckland, Co.Durham (4.3 miles)
 Ayot Greenway: Ayot St Peter to Wheathampstead, Hertfordshire (3 miles)
 Beckton Corridor: Beckton DLR station to Connaught Bridge, East London (0.5 miles)
 Bedford to Sandy: Bedfordshire
 Belmont Trail: Stanmore to Harrow, North West London (2.2 miles)
 Bembridge to Brading: Isle of Wight
 Bermondsey-Stubbs Drive to Surrey Canal Road: South London (0.5 miles approx)
 Bingham Linear Park: Nottinghamshire (2 miles)
 Blackwater Rail Trail: Witham to Maldon, Essex (8 miles)
 Bowes Railway Path: Jarrow to Tanfield Railway Museum, Tyne and Wear (11.5 miles)
 Brampton Valley Way, Northampton to Market Harborough Railway, Northamptonshire (14 miles)
 Brandon to Bishop Auckland Railway Path Broompark to Bishop Auckland, Co.Durham (9 miles)
 Bridport to West Bay: Dorset (approx 1 mile)
 Bristol and Bath Railway Path (13 miles)
 Bubwith Rail Trail: Bubwith to Market Weighton, Yorkshire (8 miles)
 Buckingham Railway Walk: Buckinghamshire (1 mile)
 Bungay: Suffolk (1 mile)
 Bure Valley Railway: Wroxham to Aylsham, Norfolk (9 miles)
 Camel Trail: Padstow to Wenford Bridge, Cornwall (17.3 miles)
 Castle Eden Walkway: Castle Eden to Thorpe Thewles, Co.Durham (9 miles)
 Castleman Trailway: Ringwood to Upton Country Park, Hampshire (16 miles)
 Centurion Way: Chichester to West Dean, West Sussex (5 miles)
 Chedworth Nature Reserve: Cheltenham to Cirencester line, Gloucestershire
 Chippenham to Calne Railway Path: Chippenham to Calne, Wiltshire (6 miles)
 Chiseldon to Marlborough Railway Path, Wiltshire (7.3 miles)
 The Cinder Track: Scarborough to Whitby, North Yorkshire (21 miles)
 The Cloud Trail: Worthington to Chellaston (part of National Cycle Route no. 6) Leicestershire/Derbyshire 
 Cole Green Way, Welwyn Garden City to Hertford, Hertfordshire (6 miles)
 Consett and Sunderland Railway Path: Co. Durham (24 miles)
 Cotgrave Country Park: Nottinghamshire (2 miles)
 Cotmanhay Linear Park: Derbyshire (0.4 miles)
 Cowes to Newport: Isle of Wight
 Crab and Winkle Line: part of Canterbury and Whitstable Railway, Kent (8 miles)
 Cuckoo Trail: Hampden Park to Heathfield, East Sussex (14 miles)
 Deerness Valley Way: Broompark to Crook, Co.Durham
 Delph Donkey Trail: Delph to Moorgate, Greater Manchester.
 Derwent Walk: Consett to Swalwell, Co.Durham (12 miles)
 Dousland to Princetown Railway Track: Devon (8 miles)
 Downs Link: Guildford to Steyning and Shoreham-by-Sea, Surrey/West Sussex (36.7 miles)
 Drakes Trail: Plymouth to Tavistock, Devon (21 miles)
 Dyke Railway Trail: Hangleton to Brighton & Hove Golf Club, East Sussex (1.25 miles)
 Ebury Way Cycle Path: Rickmansworth to Watford, Hertfordshire (3.5 miles)
 Eling Way : Hermitage to Hampstead Norreys, Berkshire (2 miles)
 Exmouth to Budleigh Salterton: Devon (4 miles)
 Fallowfield Loop, Fairfield to Chorlton-cum-Hardy, Manchester (8 miles)
 Five Pits Trail: Grassmoor to Tibshelf, Derbyshire (5.5 miles)
 Flitch Way: Bishops Stortford to Braintree, Essex (18 miles)
 Forest Way: East Grinstead to Groombridge, East/West Sussex (10 miles)
 Freshwater to Yarmouth: Isle of Wight
 Garstang and Knot-End Railway: The Fylde, Lancashire (1 mile)
 Gorleston-on-sea: Norfolk (0.5 miles approx.)
 Gosport to Stokes Bay: Hampshire (0.75 miles approx)
 Gosport to Fort Brockhurst: Hampshire (2 miles approx)
 The Granite Way, Okehampton to Lydford, Devon (11 miles) 
 The Great Central Walk- Leicester: Braunstone Gate to Glenhills, Leicestershire (4.5 miles)
 The Great Central Walk- Rugby: Rugby to Brownsover, Warwickshire (4.5 miles)
 The Great Eastern Linear Park: Lowestoft, Suffolk (1.5 miles)
 The Great Northern railway Trail Cullingworth to Queensbury in West Yorkshire
 Hadleigh Railway Walk: Hadleigh to Raydon Wood, Suffolk (2 miles)
 Hamble Rail Trail: Hamble to Southampton Water, Hampshire (4.5 miles)
 Harborne Walkway: Birmingham to Harborne, West Midlands (2.4 miles)
 Hart to Haswell Walkway: Monk Hesledon to Hart, Co.Durham.
 Haverhill, Suffolk (1.5 miles)
 Hawthorn to Ryhope Way: Seaton to South Hetton, Co.Durham
 Hayfield to New Mills: Derbyshire (3 miles)
 Hayling Billy Trail: Havant to South Hayling, Hampshire (5 miles)
 Hellingly Hospital Railway, a branch of the Cuckoo Trail
 High Peak: Hurdlow to Cromford, Derbyshire (17 miles)
 Historic Rail Trail, Goathland to Grosmont, along original Whitby and Pickering Railway alignment
 Honeybourne Line Walk: Cheltenham Spa, Gloucestershire
 Hornsea Rail Trail: Hull to Hornsea, East Yorkshire (26 miles)
 Hudson Way: Market Weighton to Beverley, East Yorkshire (10 miles)
 Hull to Winestead Rail Trail: East Yorkshire (20 miles)
 Hurworth Burn to Station Town Railway Path: Hurworth Burn to Wingate, Co. Durham (1.8 miles)
 Kelloe Way, Kelloe, Co.Durham (1.3 miles)
 Kenilworth Greenway Linear Park, Warwickshire (4 miles)
 Keswick to Threlkeld Railway Path, Cumbria (6 miles)
 Killamarsh to Renishaw part of the Trans Pennine Trail: Derbyshire
 Kirklees Trail: Bury to Greenmount, Lancashire.
 Lakenham Way: Norwich, Norfolk (approx 1 mile)
 Lancaster to Caton: Lancashire (6 miles)
 Lancaster to Morecambe: Lancashire
 Lanchester Valley Railway Path: Durham to Consett, County Durham (12 miles)
 Lavenham to Long Melford railway walk: Suffolk (4.5 miles)
 Ledbury Town Trail: Ledbury, Herefordshire (1.6 miles)
 Leicester to Ratby: Leicestershire
 The Lines Way Garforth to Allerton Bywater, Yorkshire (4 miles)
 Liss to Liss Forest Road: Hampshire (1 mile approx.)
 Longdendale Trail: Hadfield to Woodhead, Derbyshire (6.5 miles)
 Lune Estuary Path: Lancaster to Glasson Dock, Lancashire
 Manifold Way: Hulme End to Waterhouses, Staffordshire (8 miles)
 Marriott's Way: Norwich to Aylsham, Norfolk (25 miles)
 Meon Valley Railway Line: West Meon to Knowle Junction, Hampshire (11 miles)
 Mercian Way: Ironbridge to near Bridgnorth, Shropshire
 Merton Park Green Walks: Merton Park to South Wimbledon (0.1 mile)
 Meltham Greenway: Meltham, Yorkshire (0.8mls)
 Middlewood Way: Macclesfield to Marple, Cheshire (10 miles)
 Millennium Greenway: Mickle Trafford, Chester, Cheshire to Connahs Quay, Flintshire (10 miles)
 Milton Keynes redway system: former Wolverton–Newport Pagnell line, Buckinghamshire
 Mineral Tramway Trails: mid West Cornwall
 Monsal Trail: Topley Pike to Bakewell, Derbyshire (8.5 miles);
 Nailsworth to Stonehouse: Gloucestershire (3 miles)
 Newark Northgate to Bottesford; Nottinghamshire (4.8 miles)
 Newport to Sandown: Isle of Wight
 Newport to Wootton: Isle of Wight
 Nickey line: Harpenden to Hemel Hempstead, Hertfordshire (8.6 miles)
 Nidderdale Greenway: Harrogate to Ripley, North Yorkshire (4 miles): 
 North Dorset Trailway: Spetisbury to Sturminster Newton (14 miles)
 North Liverpool Extension Line: Merseyside
 Offchurch Greenway: Leamington to Rugby, Warwickshire (1.5 miles)
 Padiham Greenway: Lancashire (2 miles)
 Parkend to Cinderford: Gloucestershire
 Parkland Walk: Finsbury Park to Alexandra Palace, London (3.1 miles)
 Pegasus Way: Okehampton to Halwill, Devon
 Pentewan Trail: St Austell to Pentewan, Cornwall (8 miles)
 Perry Way: part of Stafford- Wellington line, Shropshire (3 miles)
 Phoenix Trail: Thame, Oxfordshire to Princes Risborough, Buckinghamshire (7 miles)
 Pittington Way: Pittington to Hetton-le-hole, Co.Durham (0.9 miles)
 Preston to Bamber Bridge: Lancashire
 Preston to Grimsagh: Lancashire
 Princetown Railway Walk: Princetown to Dousland, Devon
 Raisby Way: Trimdon to Coxhoe, Co.Durham (1.6 miles)
 Radstock to Frome: Somerset
 Ripley Greenway: Ripley, Derbyshire (2 miles)
 Rodwell Trail: Weymouth to Wyke Regis, Dorset (2 miles)
 Roe Green Loop: Roe Green to Monton, Lancashire
 Rowthorne Trail: Bolsover to Pleasley Colliery, Nottinghamshire/Derbyshire.
 Sandringham Railway Path: King's Lynn (Tennyson Avenue to A1078), Norfolk (1.7 miles)
 Scarborough & Whitby RailTrail, North Yorkshire
 Sett Valley Trail: Hayfield to New Mills, Derbyshire (2.5 miles)
 Parts of the Severn and Wye Railway: Forest of Dean, Gloucestershire
 Sewell Cutting Nature Reserve: Stanbridgeford to Dunstable, Bedfordshire (2.2 miles)
 Shanklin to Wroxall: Isle of Wight
 Sherburn Way: Sherburn Hill, Co.Durham (1.4 miles)
 Silkin Way: Malins Lee to Coalport (Ironbridge), Shropshire
 Skegby Trail: Sutton-in-Ashfield to Pleasley Colliery, Nottinghamshire (5 miles)
 Southport and Cheshire Lines Extension Railway: Lancashire
 South Staffordshire Railway Walk: Castlecroft to Wall Heath (5.5 miles)
 South Tyne Trail: Haltwhistle to Alston: Northumberland/Cumbria (13 miles)
 Southwell Trail: Southwell to Bilsthorpe: Nottinghamshire (7.5 miles)
 Spa Trail and Viking Way: Horncastle to Woodhall Spa (4.8 miles)
 Spen Valley Greenway Oakenshaw to Dewsbury, West Yorkshire (7 miles)
 Stockley Trail: Bolsover, Derbyshire (2 miles)
 Stratford Greenway: Stratford-upon-Avon to Long Marston, Warwickshire (4.5 miles)
 Stroud to Dudbridge: Gloucestershire 
 Strawberry Line Trail: Yatton railway station to Cheddar, Somerset
 Parts of the Tarka Trail: Braunton to Meeth, North Devon (31 miles)
 Sudbury to Long Melford: Suffolk (3 miles)
 Swindon to Rushey Platt: Wiltshire
 Tees Railway Path: Middleton-in-Teesdale to Cotherstone, Co.Durham (5.5 miles)
 Tenterden-The Old Railway Path: Tenterden to St. Michaels, Kent (approx 1 mile)
 Testway: Stonymarsh to Stockbridge, Hampshire (5 miles)
 Tetbury Trail: Tetbury to Trouble House (2 miles approx.), Gloucestershire
 Teversal Trail: Ashfield to Pleasley Colliery, Nottinghamshire.
 Thornhill Trail: Bamford, Derbyshire (2 miles)
 Tissington Trail: Parsley Hay (High Peak Trail) to Ashbourne, Derbyshire (13 miles)
 Trans Pennine Trail: Hadfield to Stocksbridge, Derbyshire/South Yorkshire
 also Latchford to Broadheath, Cheshire
 Two Tunnels Greenway (3.5 miles & Colliers Way (2.5 miles): Bath to Wellow
 Tyne Riverside Country Park: Newcastle to Wylam (4 miles)
 Varsity Way: Bedford to Sandy, Bedfordshire
 Walker Riverside Park: St.Peters to Carville, Newcastle, Tyne and Wear
 Waskerley Way: Consett to Stanhope, Co.Durham (9.7 miles)
 Water Rail Way: Lincoln to Boston (33 miles)
 Weavers Way: Bengate to Stalham, Norfolk (4.5 miles)
 Weavers Way: North Walsham to Aylsham (4.5 miles)
 West Auckland to Ramshaw: Co.Durham
 West Bridgford Green Line: Nottinghamshire 
 Wetherby to Thorp Arch: Yorkshire
 Wetherby to Spofforth: Yorkshire
 Whitehaven to Ennerdale Cyclepath: Cumbria (10 miles)
 Wirral Way: West Kirby, Merseyside to Hooton, Cheshire (13 miles)
 Worth Way: Three Bridges to East Grinstead, West Sussex (7 miles)
 Wray Valley Trail: Moretonhampstead to Bovey, Devon (7 miles)
 Wye Valley Greenway: Chepstow to Tintern, Gloucestershire (5 miles)
 Yeovil Country Park: Yeovil Pen Mill to Hendford, Somerset.(1.5 miles)
 York to Osbaldwick: Yorkshire
 York to Riccall Railway Path: Yorkshire (14 miles)

Northern Ireland
 The Comber Greenway (7 miles)
 Foyle Valley Cycle Route Derry to Strabane (21 miles)

Scotland
 Ayr to Greenan: Ayrshire
 Ballachulish to North Connel (sections now National Cycle Route no. 78)
 Corstorphine to Balgreen: Edinburgh
 Dava Way Forres to Grantown-on-Spey (24 miles)
 Deeside Way Aberdeen to Ballater (41 miles)
 Devon Way Dollar to Tillicoultry (3.25 miles)
 Elgin to Lossiemouth
 Formartine and Buchan Way Dyce to Fraserburgh and Peterhead (53 miles)
 Haddington to Longniddry Railway Walk
 Hillend Loch Railway Path (15 miles) Airdrie to Bathgate (14 miles)
 Hopeman to Burghead
 Innocent Railway Edinburgh to Brunstane (8 miles)
 Old Fordell Train Line Trail: Cowdenbeath (5 miles)
 Paisley & Clyde railway path
 Pencaitland Railway Walk, East Lothian (6.5 miles)
 Rob Roy Way Callander to Killin
 Speyside Way Craigellachie to Grantown-on-Spey (31 miles)
 Strathkelvin Railway Path Gartcosh to Strathblane (6 miles)
 Tweed Valley Railway Path Peebles to Inverleithen (5 miles)
 Water of Leith Walkway Edinburgh to Balerno (5.25 miles)

Wales
 Aberaeron Cycle Path (2.8 miles)
 Brunel Trail: Johnston to Neyland
 Bryngwyn to Tryfan Junction: Gwyneth
 Cilgerran to Cardigan
 Clyne Valley Country Park (5 miles)
 Elan Valley Trail Rhayader to Craig Goch Dam (9 miles)
 Lôn Eifion (12 miles)
 Milford Haven (0.5 miles)
 Lôn Las Cymru (National Cycle Route 8)
 Lôn Las Menai (4.0 miles)
 Part of the Lôn Las Ogwen (4 miles)
 Mawddach Trail Morfa Mawddach to Dolgellau (8 miles)
 Prestatyn to Dyserth (2.5 miles)
 Swansea to Gowerton
 Swiss Valley Cycle Route: Llanelli to Cross Hands, Carmarthenshire (10.8 miles)
 Parts of the Taff Trail
 Ystwyth Trail Aberystwyth to Tregaron (21 miles)

Jersey
 Jersey Railway (3.75 miles)

In planning/under construction 
 Wharfedale Greenway: Burley in Wharfedale to Pool in Wharfedale

North America

Bermuda 
 Bermuda Railway

Canada

Mexico 
 The abandoned Mexico City to Cuernavaca line (Linea C), transformed into a "ciclopista" or "ciclovía" (bicycle trail)

United States

Oceania

Australia 

Rails trails of significant length in Australia include:

New Zealand
 Dun Mountain Trail
 Little River Rail Trail
 Otago Central Rail Trail
 Remutaka Rail Trail

Pipeline trails 
Trails similar to rail trails can follow other infrastructure, such as water pipelines.
 Greenway, London
 Syndal Heatherdale Pipe Reserve Trail
 Tolt Pipeline Trail

Canal trails 
 C&O Canal towpath
 Long Level on the Erie Canal

External links 

 Rails-to-Trails Conservancy, United States
 http://www.bahntrassenradeln.de/ Railtrails in Germany and the world

References
 Rail trails, towpaths and other trails in Ohio

Lists of roads
Rail transport-related lists
 
Lists of bicycle routes